Hand warmers  are small, often disposable, packets that produce heat to warm cold hands. They are used throughout the world in a variety of ways, including outdoor recreation, manual labor, and homelessness.

History 
The hand and foot warmer was first patented by Jonathan T. Ellis of New Jersey in 1891, though no evidence exists that it was ever produced.

The first commercially produced hand warmer was created by Japanese inventor Niichi Matoba. Matoba received a patent for applying the principle of an oxidation reaction that produces heat by means of platinum catalysis. He then devoted his time to researching how to make the product suitable for practical use. In 1923, he manufactured a prototype of his device naming it HAKUKIN-kairo (HAKKIN warmer). A version of these original portable hand warmers is still produced in Japan.

Types

Air activated (iron) 
Air-activated hand warmers contain cellulose, iron, activated carbon, vermiculite (which holds water) and salt. They produce heat from the exothermic oxidation of iron when exposed to air. The oxygen molecules in the air react with iron, forming rust. Salt is often added to catalyze the process.

Supersaturated solution (crystallisation-type)

This type of hand warmer can be recharged by immersing the hand-warmer in very hot water until the contents are uniform and then allowing it to cool. The release of heat is triggered by flexing a small metal disk in the hand warmer, which generates nucleation centers that initiate crystallisation. Heat is required to dissolve the salt in its own water of crystallisation and it is this heat that is released when crystallisation is initiated. The latent heat of fusion is about 264–289 kJ/kg.

This process can be scaled up to create a means of domestic heating storage and can produce instant heat.

Lighter fuel
Cigarette lighter fuel hand-warmers use lighter fluid (highly refined petroleum naphtha), in a catalyst combustion unit that runs at a lower temperature than an open flame with a greatly reduced fire risk. After lighting they operate inside a fabric bag typically with a drawstring. This controls the oxygen supply to the catalyst and protects against skin burns. Re-use is simply done by refuelling. Modern units may use a glass fiber substrate coated with platinum or another catalyst; some older units used asbestos substrates. The replaceable catalyst units can last for many years provided they have combusted vapour from their cotton wadding filled fuel reservoir, and have not had fuel directly applied to them. These hand warmers are for people who work or pursue leisure activities outdoors in very low temperatures, especially those that require manual dexterity that is not possible while wearing thick gloves or mittens. They date from the foundation of the Japanese Hakkin company by Niichi Matoba, who founded it to produce a hand warmer 'Hakkin Kairo' based on his Japanese patent of 1923. John W. Smith, President of Aladdin Laboratories, Inc. of Minneapolis was awarded a US patent for a product called the Jon-e (pronounced “Johnny”) catalytic hand warmer on December 25, 1951. Production peaked in the fifties and sixties, at 10,000 warmers a day. Aladdin went out of business in the 1970s. In 2010 the Zippo lighter company introduced an all-metal catalytic hand warmer, along with other outdoor products.

Battery

Battery operated hand warmers use electrically resistive heating devices to convert electrical energy in the battery into heat. Typically hand warmers can heat for up to six hours, with heat outputs from 40-48C. Rechargeable electronic hand warmers can be charged from a mains power supply or from a 5V USB power supply, with up to 500 recharge cycles possible.

Charcoal
Charcoal hand-warmers provide heat by burning charcoal in a special case. These can last up to 6 hours and become comfortably hot. Charcoal cases for these usually have felt on the outside and have items in it that do not produce heat, but spread the heat such as metal. A charcoal hand warmer can start heating when both ends of charcoal are struck and then extinguished to create a hot charcoal. The smouldering stick is then placed inside the case. The charcoal sticks are available from most outdoor activity shops and are fairly inexpensive.

See also
 Instant cold pack
 Heating pad
 Hot water bottle
 Muff (handwarmer), a fashion item
 Kanger, a Kashmiri version of a portable personal warmer

References

Heating
Articles containing video clips